Erebus lombokensis is a moth of the family Erebidae first described by Charles Swinhoe in 1915. It is found on Lombok in Indonesia.

References

Moths described in 1915
Erebus (moth)